Barry Smyth is a head chef and former restaurant owner from Armagh, County Armagh, Northern Ireland. He was the owner of the Michelin starred restaurant The Oriel in Gilford, County Down, Northern Ireland.

Smyth worked in senior positions in several well-known restaurants, including with Paul Rankin at Roscoff Restaurant (Belfast) in its glory days, The Connaught, London, The Beechill Country House Hotel, County Londonderry, and Kilkea Castle Hotel (Castledermot, County Kildare). He is best known for his own restaurant "Oriel" 1999-2006 where he earned Michelin stars in 2004 and 2005 as well as many other accolades and wide recognition for his modern style of Irish Cuisine. Smyth sold The Oriel in 2006 to work as a chef consultant for The Hilden Brewery who opened Molly's Yard Restaurant on Botanic Avenue Belfast. He went on to work for both Belfast Met and Southern Regional College as a Culinary Lecturer.
In 2018 Smyth was appointed Head Chef at the Castle Leslie Estate, Glaslough, County Monaghan.

In 2010 and 2011 Smyth acted as culinary director at the Belfast Taste & Music Fest.

Awards
 Michelin star 2004 & 2005

References

Chefs from Northern Ireland
Living people
1973 births
Head chefs of Michelin starred restaurants